Beopgwangsa is a temple located in Pohang, Gyeongsangbuk-do, South Korea.

References

External links 
 

Pohang
Buddhist temples in South Korea
Buildings and structures in North Gyeongsang Province